Lake Malik (Albanian: Liqeni I Maliqit, Macedonian: Маличко Езеро Malicko Ezero - meaning "small lake", Greek: Λίμνη Μαλίκη Límni Malíki) is an artificially drained lake in Albania.

History 
The government took the decision to drain the lake after 1939 to combat malaria. The draining operation started in 1946 using convict labour and it created new agricultural areas.

References

Malik
Former lakes of Europe